Tulamni was a dialect of the Buena Vista Yokuts language spoken by the Yokuts around Buena Vista Lake, California.

References 

Yokutsan languages